In Search of Santa is a 2004 computer-animated Christmas adventure film starring Hilary Duff and her older sister Haylie Duff in their first voice roles. It was directed by William R. Kowalchuk and released on August 25, 2004 in Australia and on November 23, 2004 in the United States. The movie is produced using Alias Maya 3D software.

Synopsis
King Calvin and Queen Penelope have their eggs laid and as their daughters hatch, the parents name them Crystal and Lucinda. As the sisters grow, despite their differences, they compromise and head to the North Pole to find Santa Claus.

They want to save Christmas, which Crystal believes in earlier and all along. After saving a seal in the middle of their quest, both sisters meet the pirates: Capn' Cragg (a walrus), Bugkus Bill (a stork) and a pelican.

Cast 
Hilary Duff as Princess Crystal
Haylie Duff as Princess Lucinda
Jason Michas as Eugene/Gardener Elf
Kathleen Barr as Lady Agonysia/Mrs. Clause/Queen Penelope/Katie/Marcus/Mimi
Scott McNeil as Mortmottimes/Bugkus Bill/Timebomb Tom
Garry Chalk as Derridommis/Capn' Cragg
French Tickner as Santa Claus 
Dale Wilson as King Calvin
Nicole Bouma as Baby Crystal/Wing Maiden #1 & #5/Additional Voices
Tabitha St. Germain as Baby Lucinda/Additional Voices
Lee Tockar as Max/Phillip/Pup
Cathy Weseluck as William/Wing Maiden #4 & #6
Richard Newman as Narrator

Reception
The film received generally negative reviews, with viewers heavily criticizing its poor CGI animation quality and weak script. UltimateDisney wrote "the film has not succeeded in challenging, engaging, or even entertaining but it is colorful and somewhat lively" and that "the makers of In Search of Santa hope that the appeal of computer animation, Christmas, and the Duff sisters will encourage people to check their movie out."

See also
List of animated feature films
List of computer-animated films
List of children's films
 List of Christmas films
 Santa Claus in film

References

External links 

Colorland Animation

Canadian direct-to-video films
2004 computer-animated films
2004 direct-to-video films
2000s American animated films
2000s Christmas films
2000s fantasy adventure films
American Christmas films
American computer-animated films
Direct-to-video animated films
American direct-to-video films
Canadian animated feature films
Animated films about penguins
Miramax animated films
Pirate films
Santa Claus in film
American children's animated adventure films
Buena Vista Home Entertainment direct-to-video films
American children's animated fantasy films
American fantasy adventure films
Canadian Christmas films
Canadian fantasy adventure films
Films about princesses
Films set in the Arctic
Films set in Antarctica
Films set on islands
Paramount Pictures direct-to-video films
Animated films about mammals
2000s children's animated films
2000s children's fantasy films
Films about pinnipeds
2000s English-language films
Paramount Pictures animated films
2000s Canadian films